Three Men in a Boat is a 1975 BBC comedy film adapted by Tom Stoppard, directed by Stephen Frears and starring Tim Curry, Michael Palin, and Stephen Moore. It is based on the 1889 novel Three Men in a Boat by Jerome K. Jerome.

Michael Palin appeared in this film just as he was establishing his post-Monty Python career, and the film has "glints of Python-like silliness throughout".

Plot 
The film is narrated in first-person by Curry playing Jerome. Although the film follows the book's plot faithfully, it ends with an epilogue about the real-world events that shaped it. The narrator talks about the book's original appearance in Home Chimes and the excision of the serious travelogue parts by the magazine's editor. He then goes on to relate that Carl Hentschel ('Harris') was accused of being a German during the First World War (he was actually a Pole), that George Wingrave ('George') went on to become a bank manager, and that he wrote the book after returning from his honeymoon.

Cast
 Tim Curry as Jerome
 Michael Palin as Harris
 Stephen Moore as George

References

External links
 

1975 films
1975 comedy films
Films based on works by Jerome K. Jerome
Films set on boats
1970s British films